The Dead End is a 2015 Chinese crime drama film based on Xu Yigua's novel Sunspot. The film is directed by Cao Baoping, starring Deng Chao, Duan Yihong, Guo Tao, and Wang Luodan. The film was released on August 27, 2015. The film received positive reviews in regard to its performance, cinematography and mise-en-scene.

Plot 
Seven years after the events of the Water Chamber Murders, newly transferred officer Yi Guchun began to suspect that his assistant police, Xin Xiaofeng, is deeply-tied with the murders.

Cast
 Deng Chao as Xin Xiaofeng, an assistant police, Tail's adoptive father and one of the three suspects for the murder.
 Duan Yihong as Yi Guchun, Guxia's elder brother, a police officer and Xiaofeng's superior.
 Guo Tao as Yang Zidao, a taxi driver, Tail's adoptive father, Guxia's love interest and one of the three suspects for the murder.
 Wang Luodan as Yi Guxia, Guchun's younger sister.
 Jackie Lui as David, a Taiwanese architect and designer.
 Li Xiaochuan
 Du Zhiguo
 Xu Xihan as Tail, the trio's adoptive daughter.
 Yan Bei
 Wang Yanhui
 Bai Liuxi
 Gao Hu as Chen Bijue, a fisherman, Tail's adoptive father and one of the three suspects for the murder.

Production
During the filming phase, Deng Chao almost suffocated during a scene where his character's leg was supposed to be stuck in an iron fence. He also suffered from insomnia, mental breakdown, depression and claustrophobia for a short while during and after filming.

Accolades

References

External links
 

2015 films
Chinese crime drama films
2015 crime drama films
Films based on Chinese novels
Films directed by Cao Baoping